Robin White and Shelby Cannon were the defending champions but lost in the second round to Zina Garrison and Rick Leach.

Elizabeth Smylie and Todd Woodbridge won in the final 6–4, 6–2 against Natasha Zvereva and Jim Pugh.

Seeds
Champion seeds are indicated in bold text while text in italics indicates the round in which those seeds were eliminated.

Draw

Final

Top half

Bottom half

References
1990 US Open – Doubles draws and results at the International Tennis Federation

Mixed Doubles
US Open (tennis) by year – Mixed doubles